= Flabellate =

Flabellate means "fan-shaped" and may refer to:

- flabellate, a leaf shape in plants
- flabellate, an antenna shape in insects

== See also ==
- flabellata, a term appearing in species names, see
